The 1928 Montana State Bobcats football team represented Montana State College (later renamed Montana State University) in the Rocky Mountain Conference (RMC) during the 1928 college football season. In its first season under head coach Schubert R. Dyche, the team compiled a 4–4–1 record (3–2 against RMC opponents), finished sixth in the conference, and was outscored by a total of 121 to 81.

Schedule

References

Montana State
Montana State Bobcats football seasons
Montana State Bobcats football